was an official title of the senior 5th rank, the highest attainable for gungnyeo, a lady-in-waiting during the Joseon Dynasty of Korea. Female officers with the title were assigned to govern the inner affairs of the palace. Therefore, a newly appointed  was usually 35–45 years old.

The title first appears in Goryeosa ('History of Goryeo'), a compiled book about the Goryeo period. In the chapter of the book titled , regarding all official titles, there were posts named  (managing the palace),  (managing bedding),  ( managing food), and another  (managing sewing) during the reign of King Hyeonjong. These records prove that the  system had existed since the Goryeo period.

The  was largely divided into  (literally 'internal offices') and  according to Gyeongguk daejeon. The former refers to a king's concubines or a crown prince's consort while  are female officers with a rank.

Types of  
 – also called . They had the highest position among , and they were responsible for the management of properties. They served the king with many other ladies-in-waiting in his palace, received the king's orders and held political power.
 – also called ; they managed the properties in the warehouse of the palace.
 – also called ; they waited closely on the king.
 – literally 'a nurse '; they took care of the princes and princesses.
 – literally 'a maid-in-waiting '; they assisted  with books and ceremony.

See also 
Gungnyeo
Dae Jang Geum
Shadows in the Palace
Korean royal court cuisine

References 

Korean women
Women by social class
Obsolete occupations
Goryeo
Joseon dynasty
Korean ladies-in-waiting
History of women in Korea